"In Dreams" is a song composed and sung by singer Roy Orbison. An operatic rock ballad of lost love, it was released as a single on Monument Records in February 1963.  It became the title track on the album In Dreams, released in July of the same year. The song has a unique structure in seven musical movements in which Orbison sings through two octaves, beyond the range of most rock and roll singers.

The song peaked on the Billboard Hot 100 charts at number 7, and charted in the United Kingdom for five months while Orbison toured sharing billing with the Beatles. It gained notability again in 1987 when Orbison released a re-recorded anthology of his greatest hits; the year prior David Lynch had used the song provocatively in his neo-noir Blue Velvet, helping to revive Orbison's career. The theme of the song was interwoven in similar compositions throughout his tenure as a musician. As a result, several collections of Orbison's music share the title of the song. Rolling Stone listed "In Dreams" at number 319 of their 500 Greatest Songs of All Time.

Background 
In 1956, Roy Orbison was signed to Sun Records that launched rockabilly legends such as Elvis Presley and Carl Perkins. Orbison's first releases reflected the style in "Ooby Dooby", "Go! Go! Go!", and a song he wrote for the Everly Brothers about his future wife, "Claudette". Orbison found marginal success at Sun Records, but felt that his talents were not being employed appropriately because he was made to sing twelve-bar rock standards with heavy guitars and drums.

In 1960, when he moved to Monument Records, Orbison's style changed to what he would become known for the rest of his career. With "Only the Lonely", co-written with Joe Melson and recorded by Bill Porter, Orbison's songs turned to introspective and plaintive ballads, and they fully employed his powerful three-octave vocal range backed by more orchestral accompaniment. A recurring musical theme in many of Orbison's songs is a climax in a story that is represented by a raw, emotionally vulnerable confession sung in an "eerily high falsetto", according to author Peter Lehman.

Orbison was a rare performer; when many rock and roll concerts were accompanied with frenetic performances onstage, Orbison rarely moved. His voice was what got the attention of listeners. k.d. lang, who sang "Crying" with him in a duet, later wrote, "It wasn't like Elvis: It wasn't like your loins were on fire or anything like that. It's more like Roy was a private place to go — a solace or a refuge." Monument Records founder Fred Foster said of him, "He used such intricate, beautiful melodies. He brought a kind of baroque, classical style to pop music."

Composition 

Orbison later claimed that the origin for "In Dreams" came to him while he was sleeping, as many of his songs did. He often heard music while asleep with a radio disc jockey announcing that it was Elvis Presley's new song. For this song, however, he was half awake when he imagined it, and thought, "Boy that's good. I need to finish that. Too bad things don't happen in my dreams." When he woke up the next morning, the entire composition was written in 20 minutes.

Like many of Orbison's songs, "In Dreams" rejects the verse-chorus-verse-bridge-chorus structure of the majority of rock and roll fare. Instead it mirrors the procession of falling asleep and becoming immersed in an elusive fantasy. It begins like a lullaby with minimal acoustic guitar strums, with Orbison introducing the listener to "A candy-colored clown they call the sandman" half-spoken and half-sung in a Sprechgesang fashion common in operas and other musical theater performances.  The sandman puts him to sleep, where he begins singing about dreams of his lover. Drums pick up the rhythm to follow Orbison's lyrics further into subconsciousness, and a piano joins as the lyrics recount how Orbison spends time with her, accompanied by breathy backup singers. Orchestra strings counter his melody that has the effect of representing a singing voice in themselves.

Using a five- to eight-note range, Orbison's voice rises as he wakes up to find his lover gone. The song trips; the music stops and a staccato tattoo replaces it, as he cries when remembering she has left him. The climax is a powerful crescendo as he cries "It's too bad that all these things / Can only happen in my dreams", and the resolution follows his voice from falsetto to the final note an octave below as he sings "Only in dreams / In beautiful dreams", as all the instruments and singers conclude with him abruptly. The song never repeats a section. In two minutes and forty-eight seconds, it goes through seven movements with distinct melodies and chord progressions. The first two sections are sixteen bars each; the rest are only eight bars. In comparison to the standard form of pop songs in AABA — where A represents a standard verse, and B represents a variation, usually referred to as the bridge — "In Dreams", with each variation, can be represented as Intro-A-B-C-D-E-F.

Reception and legacy 

"In Dreams" was recorded at the RCA Studio B in Nashville on January 4, 1963, and released later the same month. "In Dreams" peaked at number 7 on Billboard Hot 100 and spent 13 weeks on the charts in the U.S.  Cash Box described it as "a lovely, Joe Tanner ork-choral supported cha cha beat opus." During the five months the song was on the charts, Orbison replaced guitarist Duane Eddy on a tour of England. He was immensely popular in England, and shared billing with the Beatles, of whom he had never heard. English and Scottish promoters were wary of Orbison as a draw; he was not conventionally attractive or animated while performing, and they wondered if audiences would walk out. The tour sold out in one afternoon, however. Orbison's first meeting with John Lennon was awkward because Orbison was overwhelmed with the amount of advertising devoted to the Beatles when it was he who was supposed to headline the show. Beatlemania, however, was taking hold and Orbison accepted that he was not quite the main draw, so he decided to go first on stage. On opening night, the audience reacted intensely toward Orbison's ballads, as he finished with "In Dreams". Philip Norman, a Beatles biographer, later wrote "As Orbison performed, chinless and tragic, the Beatles stood in the wings, wondering how they would dare to follow him". After demanding Orbison play for double the time he was scheduled, the audience then screamed for a fifteenth encore, which Lennon and Paul McCartney refused to allow by holding Orbison back from re-entering the stage.

A compilation of Orbison's most successful songs was re-recorded in January 1986 and released in 1987 under the title In Dreams: The Greatest Hits. It coincided with the release of the dark and surreal mystery thriller Blue Velvet,  directed by David Lynch. Orbison was astonished at the way Lynch used "In Dreams". In the film, a murderous and morally bankrupt psychopath named Frank Booth (played by Dennis Hopper) is obsessed with the song and demands it be played repeatedly, calling it "Candy Colored Clown". In one scene it is lip-synced by a flamboyant character named Ben, played by Dean Stockwell, after which Booth becomes enraged. In another scene Booth beats the protagonist while playing the song. Lynch later stated, "it is a beautiful song and it was written by Roy... Those lyrics, that feel meant something to him. And it just so happened that a song in a certain situation could mean something else. And the way that Frank Booth used that song in two different places, it is just kind of unbelievable. But I can see why Roy was upset because for him it meant a third thing."

Orbison did not authorize the use of the song or know it was going to be used, but the use of "In Dreams" proved beneficial to his career, which had stalled in the 1970s. BAM magazine called the song "the emotional epicenter of the film". Orbison biographer Ellis Amburn called "In Dreams" deceptively simple and that it is used to significant effect in Blue Velvet because it suggests dreaming is preferable to waking, and power and control are the real themes of the song, instead of love, longing, and loss. The film made the song a cult favorite, and after seeing it a few times, Orbison reconsidered his stance on its use. After the movie, Orbison re-recorded "In Dreams" yet again in 1987, for which Jeff Ayeroff brought David Lynch in to help Orbison. A music video for the new re-recording was directed by Leslie Libman. Footage of the Lynch film is featured in the 1987 music video of "In Dreams", and interspersed with live action shots of Orbison's image projected over a filmy linen cloth blowing in the wind. In 2022, the song was also used in the first episode of Tim Burton's Wednesday series, in a scene in which Morticia and Gomez Addams sing along with, serenading each other.

While listening to the Blue Velvet soundtrack on repeat during a sleepless night, Bono of the rock group U2 became fixated on "In Dreams". After eventually finding sleep, he awoke with another song in his head, which he at first presumed to be a different Orbison tune. This became "She's a Mystery to Me", a song written by Bono and fellow U2 member The Edge for Orbison. It appeared on Orbison's final album, Mystery Girl, released in 1989. On the same album, "In Dreams" received its companion piece, "In the Real World", which was written by Will Jennings and Richard Kerr. Many of Orbison's songs either address dreaming or are presented in a dreamlike style. In addition to the album released in 1963 and the re-recorded album of hits in 1987, a Canadian documentary on Orbison's life and impact on rock and roll also touched on the theme exemplified by the song; it was titled In Dreams: The Roy Orbison Story and released in 1999.

Weekly charts

Citations

Bibliography 
 Amburn, Ellis (1990). Dark Star: The Roy Orbison Story, Carol Publishing Group. 
 Clayson, Alan (1989). Only the Lonely: Roy Orbison's Life and Legacy, St. Martin's Press. 
 Creswell, Toby (2006). 1001 Songs: The Greatest Songs of All Time and the Artists, Stories, and Secrets Behind Them, Thunder's Mouth Press. 
 Lehman, Peter (2003). Roy Orbison: The Invention of An Alternative Rock Masculinity, Temple University Press. 
 

1963 singles
Songs about dreams
Roy Orbison songs
Irish Singles Chart number-one singles
Songs written by Roy Orbison
Monument Records singles
Song recordings produced by Fred Foster
1963 songs
Sandman
1960s ballads
Rock ballads
Pop ballads